Bogatyryov (masculine) or Bogatyryova (feminine) is a Russian surname. Notable people with the surname include:

Abumuslim Bogatyryov (born 1984), Russian footballer
Anatoly Bogatyrev (1913–2003), Belarusian composer and music teacher
Timur Bogatyryov (born 1965), Russian footballer and manager
Yuri Bogatyryov (1947–1989), Soviet actor

Russian-language surnames